Nargiz Süleymanova (born 6 September 2004) is a German figure skater. On the junior level, she is the 2019 Golden Spin of Zagreb bronze medalist, the 2019 NRW Trophy bronze medalist, the 2019 Golden Bear of Zagreb bronze medalist, and the 2020 German junior national champion.

She placed 19th at the 2020 World Junior Figure Skating Championships.

Programs

Results 
CS: Challenger Series; JGP: Junior Grand Prix

Detailed results 
Small medals for short and free programs awarded only at ISU Championships.

Senior results

Junior results

References

External links 

 

2004 births
Living people
German female single skaters
People from Mühlhausen
Sportspeople from Thuringia